Flor de Oro Airport  is an airport adjacent to the Flor de Oro Lodge in Bolivia's Noel Kempff Mercado National Park.

The national park is in the Santa Cruz Department, and is noted for its varied wildlife habitats, scenery, and waterfalls. The lodge is on the south bank of the Iténez River, locally the border between Bolivia and Brazil.

Accessible through charter flights, the airport is the entrance to the northern reaches of the park. It is the closest runway to Arcoiris Falls.

See also

Transport in Bolivia
List of airports in Bolivia

References

External links 
OpenStreetMap - Flor de Oro
OurAirports - Flor de Oro
Fallingrain - Flor de Oro Airport

Airports in Santa Cruz Department (Bolivia)